William Frost was a Welsh aviator.

William Frost may also refer to:

William Frost (MP) (died c.1408), MP for City of York
William Edward Frost, English painter
William Goodell Frost, Greek scholar and president of Berea College
Jack Frost (detective) (William Edward Frost), fictional character in A Touch of Frost